Ronnie William Arneill (born February 19, 1981) is a Canadian professional wrestler and trainer currently signed to All Elite Wrestling (AEW) under the ring name Shawn Spears. He is also known for his time with WWE under the ring name Tye Dillinger.

Having begun his career on the independent circuit as Shawn Spears, Arneill initially joined WWE in 2006 and worked for the company between 2006 and 2009, performing in the developmental territories Ohio Valley Wrestling (OVW) and Florida Championship Wrestling (FCW) as well as briefly on the main roster brand ECW under the slightly modified ring name Gavin Spears. After being released from WWE in 2009, he returned to the independent scene, before rejoining WWE in 2013 where he was assigned to NXT under the new gimmick of Tye Dillinger. After a rise in popularity, Dillinger was promoted to the main roster in April 2017, working on the SmackDown brand until his second release from the company in February 2019.

Shortly after leaving WWE, he signed with the newly founded promotion All Elite Wrestling in May 2019, reverting to his Shawn Spears name.

Early life
Born and raised in St. Catharines, Ontario, Arneill attended Laura Secord Secondary School. He played hockey for over ten years until he decided to leave the sport and enter professional wrestling. During his childhood, he was a fan of Rick Rude, Rick Martel, and Mr. Perfect.

Professional wrestling career

Early career (2002–2006)
Arneill trained at the Hart Wrestling School in Cambridge Ontario with Smith Hart, Ike Shaw and Waldo Von Erich and then with Eric Young at the WrestlePlex school before receiving further training from Derek Wylde and Cody Deaner. Upon wrestling his debut match in March 2002 as Shawn Spears, he began wrestling for some of the biggest independent wrestling promotions throughout Ontario and the United States, including Border City Wrestling, World Xtreme Wrestling, and Blood Sweat and Ears. On February 27, 2005, Arneill made an appearance on an edition of WWE Heat, unsuccessfully teaming with Mikael Yamaha to face The Hurricane and Rosey.

After sending a tape to World Wrestling Entertainment (WWE) officials, Arneill was called for a try-out in Buffalo, New York. He was signed to a developmental contract by WWE following the tryout, on January 21, 2006. He made a cameo appearance at Cyber Sunday as an employee called "Stan", who gets superkicked by Shawn Michaels of D-Generation X when Michaels is told that he doesn't understand the meaning of the word "controversial".

World Wrestling Entertainment (2006–2009)

Developmental territories (2006–2008)

After signing his WWE contract, Arneill was assigned to the company's developmental territory, Ohio Valley Wrestling (OVW). He made his OVW television debut as "The Canadian Sensation" Shawn Spears, where he defeated then-SmackDown! superstar Simon Dean. After his victory, Dean attacked Spears until Spears was saved by Al Snow, who fended off Dean with a chair. After his debut, Spears quickly made an impact in OVW with a short undefeated streak that was soon ended by Aaron "The Idol" Stevens when Stevens made Spears submit. After this, Spears formed a tag team with Cody Runnels and they feuded with The Throwbacks for the Southern Tag Team Championship. On December 15, 2006, Spears and Runnels won the title from The Throwbacks. During 2006 Spears appeared at Cyber Sunday 2006 as backstage producer Stan, getting superkicked by Shawn Michaels.

On March 17, 2007, Spears won the Television Championship from Boris Alexiev, his first singles title in OVW. Soon after winning the title, he became more focused on championships and even began trying to steal Runnels' Heavyweight Championship opportunity. During Runnels' Heavyweight Title match, Spears interfered and performed a piledriver to Runnels, preventing him from winning the Heavyweight Championship and thus solidifying his heel turn. Spears then began feuding with Runnels and eventually lost the Television Championship to him on July 6, 2007 before winning it back one week later. He once again lost the title on September 19 to the debuting Ted "Manbeast" McNailer. Spears later regained the Television Title, only to lose it to Colt Cabana. Spears then began feuding with Cabana and the pair would go on to win the vacant Tag Team Title with on November 7 after defeating Paul Burchill and Stu Sanders. On December 19, Cabana and Spears' feud culminated in a ladder match in which the winner would claim the Tag Team titles for themselves and choose a new partner. Spears lost to Cabana, who then chose Charles "The Hammer" Evans as his new tag team partner.

After OVW split with WWE, Spears debuted in WWE's new development territory, Florida Championship Wrestling (FCW), and teamed up with Nic Nemeth to defeat The Puerto Rican Nightmares for the Florida Tag Team Championship on August 17. Nearly a month later, Nemeth and Spears lost the title to Joe Hennig and Heath Miller on September 11.

ECW (2008–2009)
On the August 19 episode of ECW, Spears made his WWE television debut as a heel under the name Gavin Spears as part of Theodore Long's "New Superstar Initiative" in a losing effort to Ricky Ortiz. After his ECW debut, Spears began splitting time between ECW and FCW. On the September 2 edition of ECW, Spears was defeated by Super Crazy. After a three-month absence due to competing in FCW, Spears returned to television on the December 16 episode of ECW, where he lost to Finlay in what turned out to be his final match for the company. On January 9, 2009, Arneill was released from his contract.

Independent circuit (2009–2013)

The day before he had been released from WWE, Arneill had broken his hand, and was unable to wrestle for 12 weeks following his release as a result. On May 27, 2009, Spears wrestled and lost to fellow WWE alumnus Elijah Burke in a tryout dark match for Total Nonstop Action Wrestling at their Impact! television tapings. On June 12, Spears made an appearance for Ring of Honor (ROH), where he defeated Alex Payne.

On May 16, 2010, Arneill, under his Gavin Spears ring name, teamed up with El Hijo de L.A. Park in a losing effort to Dr. Wagner III and Gigante Extassis on an Extreme Air Wrestle show in Mexico, marking his first tour of Mexico. On May 28 and 29, Arneill made appearances at the 2010 Anime North convention.

On August 15, he teamed up with Idol Stevens to capture the WWC World Tag Team Championship after defeating Thunder and Lightning. On October 31, Spears and Stevens lost the World Tag Team Title back to Thunder and Lightning.

Return to WWE (2013–2019)

NXT (2013–2017)
On September 15, 2013, it was reported that Spears had re-signed with WWE, and he was assigned to WWE's developmental territory NXT under the ring name Tye Dillinger. He made his televised NXT debut in a losing effort against Mojo Rawley. In early 2014, Dillinger formed a tag team with Jason Jordan, with the two described as a pair of blue chip athletes. The team of Dillinger and Jordan got their first televised win on the April 17 episode of NXT, defeating Baron Corbin and Sawyer Fulton. On the June 5 episode of NXT, Dillinger and Jordan defeated local competitors. On the August 7 episode of NXT, Dillinger and Jordan lost in the first round of a NXT Tag Team Championship tournament to Enzo Amore and Colin Cassady. Dillinger and Jordan then appeared infrequently together, with Dillinger mostly being used as enhancement talent. On the February 25, 2015 episode of NXT, Dillinger's partnership with Jordan officially ended when Jordan unhappy with his partner not initially tagging him in, jumped off the apron and walked out on Dillinger just as he went to make the tag. After the match, an enraged Dillinger called out his old partner but instead was met with a quick loss to Baron Corbin.

On the August 12 episode of NXT, Dillinger debuted a new gimmick as the "Perfect 10" and defeated Solomon Crowe. He faced the debuting Apollo Crews at NXT TakeOver: Brooklyn and another debuting Andrade "Cien" Almas at NXT TakeOver: The End, but he lost both matches. On the September 28, 2016 episode of NXT, Dillinger was approached by Bobby Roode, who proposed the two team up for the Dusty Rhodes Tag Team Classic, which Dillinger accepted. On the October 12 episode of NXT, Roode walked out on Dillinger during a tag team match against SAnitY (Alexander Wolfe and Sawyer Fulton), resulting in the team losing in the first round. The following week on NXT, Dillinger called out Roode for a match at NXT TakeOver: Toronto, thus turning face in the process. At the event, Dillinger lost to Roode. 

On the December 14 episode of NXT, Dillinger defeated Eric Young by disqualification in a number one contender's Fatal 4-Way qualifying match. At NXT TakeOver: San Antonio, Dillinger was defeated by Young following a distraction from Alexander Wolfe and Killian Dain. At NXT TakeOver: Orlando, Dillinger teamed up with Roderick Strong, Kassius Ohno and Ruby Riot to take on SAnitY in an 8-person mixed tag team match in a losing effort. Dillinger made his last NXT appearance on the April 5 tapings, closing out the event by winning a Steel Cage match against Eric Young.

SmackDown (2017–2019)
On January 29, 2017, at Royal Rumble, Dillinger was a surprise entrant in the Royal Rumble match, entering at number 10 but was eliminated by Braun Strowman. On the April 4 episode of SmackDown Live, Dillinger would make his main roster debut, defeating Curt Hawkins. Dillinger would enter a short feud with Aiden English, defeating him on various episodes of SmackDown Live, leading to a match at Backlash, where Dillinger once again defeated English to end their feud.

On the July 4 episode of SmackDown Live, Dillinger would compete in an Independence Day Battle Royal to determine the number one contender to the United States Championship, lasting until the final three before being eliminated by Sami Zayn. At Battleground, Dillinger briefly reignited his feud with English, with Dillinger facing him in a losing effort. On the August 29 episode of SmackDown Live, Dillinger would confront and brawl with Baron Corbin, who was about to answer an open challenge set by AJ Styles for the United States Championship. After Dillinger would fight off Corbin, he would take on Styles' challenge in a losing effort. On the September 12 episode of SmackDown Live, Dillinger would get another shot at the title against Styles, once again in a losing effort. After trading victories with Corbin on various episodes of SmackDown Live, both Dillinger and Corbin would challenge Styles for the United States Championship at Hell in a Cell in a triple threat match, where Corbin would win the title. On the December 26 episode of SmackDown Live, Dillinger would compete in a United States Championship tournament, after former champion Dolph Ziggler vacated the title the week before, where Dillinger would be defeated by Jinder Mahal in the first round.

At Royal Rumble, Dillinger was to be the number 10 entrant in the Royal Rumble match but was attacked backstage by Kevin Owens and Sami Zayn, with Zayn taking his spot. At Fastlane, Dillinger would team with Breezango (Fandango and Tyler Breeze), defeating the team of Chad Gable, Shelton Benjamin and Mojo Rawley. At WrestleMania 34, Dillinger would compete in the André the Giant Memorial Battle Royal, where he was eliminated by Matt Hardy. In his final pay-per-view appearance, Dillinger competed in the Greatest Royal Rumble, where he entered at number 42, but was quickly eliminated by Braun Strowman. On the July 10 episode of SmackDown Live, Dillinger was scheduled to face Samoa Joe, however, Joe attacked him after the match, this led to the next week Dillinger to challenge Joe in a losing effort. At a WWE live event on August 13, Dillinger was injured in a match with Shelton Benjamin. The referee called for the end of the match, giving Benjamin the win via count out. Dillinger was promptly escorted backstage by officials. Dillinger returned on the September 25 episode of SmackDown Live, challenging Shinsuke Nakamura for the WWE United States Championship; however, he was attacked during the match by Randy Orton, in what was Dillinger's last televised match with the company.

Dillinger suffered a hand injury in October 2018 which kept him out of action for several months. He returned to in-ring competition at a house show on February 9, 2019; however, he was still not used on television. On February 19, 2019, Dillinger announced in a Twitter statement that he had requested his release from WWE and was granted on February 22, 2019.

Return to independent circuit (2019) 
After his release from WWE, Arneill reverted to using the ring name, Shawn Spears once again. On March 1, 2019, he announced on Twitter that he will be accepting bookings on the independent circuit starting May 31. On the June 5 episode of Beyond Wrestling's weekly show, Spears debuted for the promotion defeating Orange Cassidy in the main event.

All Elite Wrestling

Early feuds (2019–2020) 
Arneill, under his previous name of Shawn Spears, debuted for All Elite Wrestling (AEW) at their inaugural pay-per-view event Double or Nothing, competing in the pre-show Casino Battle Royale. He would fail to win, however, as the match was won by Adam Page. In an interview with Sports Illustrated, Spears stated he would be appearing with the promotion going forward. His signing would officially be announced on June 12. At Fyter Fest in June, Spears established himself as a heel after hitting Cody with a steel chair shot to the top of the head. Going forward he would begin calling himself "The Chairman of AEW". At All Out on August 31, Spears unsuccessfully faced Cody in a singles match. Leading to All Out, Spears aligned with Tully Blanchard, who began acting as his manager. Spears would then start a feud with Joey Janela, after Janela had disrespected Blanchard. At Full Gear on November 9, Spears defeated Janela. In February 2020, Blanchard and Spears began a campaign to recruit a new tag team partner for Spears. However, the angle was soon dropped due to the COVID-19 pandemic. Shortly after, Spears was used primarily in a comedic role as he mocked Dustin Rhodes and the Rhodes family in a news report parody segment and challenged Dustin Rhodes to a match at Double or Nothing. At Double or Nothing, Spears had his clothes ripped off and was defeated by Dustin Rhodes.

On the June 3 episode of Dynamite, Blanchard returned and berated Spears for making a joke out of himself at Double or Nothing. He then presented him with a black glove, similar to the one worn by Blackjack Mulligan and Ted DiBiase, that can be illegally loaded with a metal slug. Spears made his in-ring return on the June 16 edition of Dark wearing the black glove, scoring a submission victory over Lee Johnson after applying the Sharpshooter on Johnson. Over the months, Spears claimed victories over various competitors, then knocked them out with his loaded black glove. He later disposed of the glove after an interview with AEW commentator Tony Schiavone. In October, Spears began a short feud against Scorpio Sky after taunting him several times before his matches. On the November 11 episode of Dynamite, Spears defeated Sky, ending their feud.

The Pinnacle (2020-2022) 
After the December 23 episode of Dynamite, Spears was absent from AEW television, but was present on the stage for the ten-bell salute during the Brodie Lee Celebration of Life on December 30. He made his return on March 3, reuniting with Blanchard and FTR by helping them defeat Jurassic Express. On March 10, Spears, Blanchard and FTR joined a faction led by MJF, later known as The Pinnacle. Pinnacle would begin a feud with The Inner Circle, defeating them in a Blood and Guts match at Blood and Guts before losing in a Stadium Stampede match at Double or Nothing. In early 2022, the Pinnacle began to dissolve. Spears continued aligning himself with MJF in the latter's feud against Wardlow. Spears lost to Wardlow on the May 25 edition of Dynamite in a steel cage match, with MJF as special guest referee.

Face turn (2022-present)
Spears would return on the October 12 episode of Dynamite in Toronto as a face, reverting to his ‘Perfect 10’ gimmick from WWE.

Other media
Arneill, as Tye Dillinger, appears in the video games WWE 2K17 (as downloadable content), WWE 2K18 and WWE 2K19 as a playable character.

Personal life
In August 2019, Arneill married Australian wrestler Cassandra McIntosh, best known by her ring names Peyton Royce and Cassie Lee. 

It was announced on August 3, 2022, that he and McIntosh were expecting their first child together, later revealed to be a boy., on January 17, 2023, they welcomed to their son Austin Jay Arneill.

He along with wrestler Matthew Clement (better known as Tyler Breeze) run a wrestling school in Apopka, Florida, called Flatbacks Wrestling.

Championship and accomplishments 
American Combat Wrestling
ACW Heavyweight Championship (1 time)
King Of Florida (2010)
Florida Championship Wrestling
FCW Florida Tag Team Championship (1 time) – with Nic Nemeth
Florida Underground Wrestling
FUW Tag Team Championship (1 time) – with Kenny Kendrick
Ground Breaking Pro Wrestling
GBPW Championship (1 time)
Ohio Valley Wrestling
OVW Heavyweight Championship (1 time)
OVW Television Championship (3 times)
OVW Southern Tag Team Championship (3 times) – with Cody Runnels (2) and Colt Cabana (1)
Prairie Wrestling Alliance
PWA Commonwealth Championship (1 time, current)
Pro Wrestling Illustrated
Ranked No. 114 of the top 500 singles wrestlers in the PWI 500 in 2017
Pure Wrestling Association
PWA Pure Wrestling Championship (1 time)
Tri-City Wrestling
TCW Heavyweight Championship (1 time)
World Wrestling Council
WWC World Tag Team Championship (1 time) – with Idol Stevens

References

External links

 
 
 
 
 

1981 births
All Elite Wrestling personnel
Canadian expatriate professional wrestlers in the United States
Canadian male professional wrestlers
Living people
Professional wrestlers from Ontario
Professional wrestling trainers
People from St. Catharines
Twitch (service) streamers
21st-century professional wrestlers
FCW Florida Tag Team Champions